OVG Oak View Group, LLC is an American Global Advisory, Development and Investment Company for Sports and Live Entertainment industries. Based in Los Angeles, it was formed on November 16, 2015 by Tim Leiweke and his business partner, Irving Azoff. Leiweke is the company's chief executive officer.

History & business developments
The former KeyArena in Seattle was redeveloped in preparation for the Seattle Kraken, the city's National Hockey League team. The new arena, named Climate Pledge Arena via a naming rights deal with Amazon is also the home to the WNBA's Seattle Storm. On December 4, 2017, the Seattle City Council voted 7–1 to approve a memorandum of understanding with the Oak View Group for the redevelopment, which built a new subterranean arena on the existing site while retaining the historical landmarked roof and three exterior walls. Demolition and construction for the new arena began in 2018 and was fully completed in 2021. The company was competing against a rival proposal by Chris Hansen.

On December 7, the NHL's board of governors agreed to consider an application for an expansion team from Seattle, with an expansion fee set at $650 million. The Seattle ownership group is represented by David Bonderman and Jerry Bruckheimer. On February 20, Mayor Jenny Durkan launched an NHL campaign during her State of the Union and announced that the Oak View Group would be initiating a season ticket drive on March 1, 2018. OVG manages Climate Pledge Arena.

The group is also a partner in UBS Arena with the New York Islanders. In December 2017, New York Arena Partners (a venture of the Islanders, Oak View Group, and Sterling Equities) won a bid to construct a new, 18,000-seat arena and mixed-used district at Belmont Park, beating a competing proposal by New York City FC for a new soccer stadium. The new arena was completed in time for the 2021-22 season.

In 2016, Oak View Group announced an "Arena Alliance" of independent arenas such as AT&T Center (San Antonio), Scotiabank Arena (Toronto), Amalie Arena (Tampa Bay), BB&T Center (Ft. Lauderdale), Bankers Life Fieldhouse (Indianapolis), Chase Center (San Francisco), PPG Paints Arena (Pittsburgh), KeyBank Center (Buffalo), The Forum (Los Angeles), Golden 1 Center (Sacramento), Little Caesars Arena (Detroit), Madison Square Garden (New York), Pepsi Center (Denver), State Farm Arena (Atlanta), Prudential Center (Newark), Rocket Mortgage FieldHouse (Cleveland), Rogers Arena (Vancouver), Enterprise Center (St. Louis), United Center (Chicago), Wells Fargo Center (Philadelphia), and Xcel Energy Center (St. Paul).

In 2016, the company acquired Venues Today, a trade publication for the live entertainment industry. In 2017, the company purchased Pollstar, a trade publication for the concert industry.
 
In 2018, it was announced that Oak View Group and the University of Texas at Austin (UT) had agreed to build a new $338 million arena for the Texas Longhorns men's and women's basketball programs to replace the Frank Erwin Center. Under the agreement, UT has exclusive use of the arena for 60 days per year and receives all revenue from Longhorns games, while Oak View and its partners Live Nation and C3 Presents have the right to hold events on the other days, receiving the bulk of the revenue from those dates. The arena, ultimately named Moody Center, opened in April 2022.

In 2019, Oak View Group launched Oak View Group International. Based in London, it will focus on building arena and stadium development and partnership opportunities in the UK, Europe, the Middle East, and Asia. Jessica Koravos, president of Andrew Lloyd Webber’s Really Useful Group, and formerly MD of Anschutz Entertainment Group Live and COO of AEG Europe, serves as co-chair of OVG International alongside Tim Leiweke.

In February 2019, it was announced that Oak View Group had become the arena manager of Webster Bank Arena, now known as Total Mortgage Arena, in Bridgeport, Connecticut. Oak View Group also will operate Acrisure Arena in Palm Desert, California. Upon completion in December 2022, the arena became the home ice for the Kraken's American Hockey League affiliate, the Coachella Valley Firebirds.

In August 2021, it was announced that Oak View Group and Spectra, a venue management company, would be merging to form a full-service live events company. In October 2021, Oak View Group partnered with the Hamilton Urban Precinct Entertainment Group (HUPEG) to redevelop Hamilton, Ontario's Arts and Entertainment district, including a renovation of FirstOntario Centre.

On March 30, 2022, Oak View announced its largest project to date, a 20,000-seat arena in Las Vegas.

References

External links
Website for the Oak View Group

Entertainment companies based in California
Sports event promotion companies
Companies based in Los Angeles
2015 establishments in California